Haji Ibrahim Nur or Hon. Haji Ibrahim Nur was a Somali politician, minister and merchant.  He was the part of the British Somaliland Protectorate cabinet before the formation and unification of the Somali republic. He was born in Borama in the Awdal region of Somaliland.

History 
Haji Ibrahim Nur was born in Borama. He was one of the 4 officials who added their signatories along with Mohamed Ibrahim Egal, Garad Ali Garad Jama and Ahmed Hajji Duale (Keyse) for the unification of the former British Somaliland and Italian Somaliland (Somalia Italiana). He was among the wealthiest merchants in the former British protectorate.

References 

British Somaliland people of World War II
Somalian politicians
Gadabuursi
People from Awdal